The Fickle Finger of Fate (also known as El Dedo del destino and The Cup of St. Sebastian) is a 1967 comedy film directed by Richard Rush, produced by Sidney W. Pink, and starring Tab Hunter. Hunter stars as a clumsy businessman who accidentally gets wrapped up in a plot of intrigue while on a trip to Spain.

Cast
Tab Hunter as Jerry
Luis Prendes as Winkle
Gustavo Rojo as Estrala
Fernando Hilbeck as Fuentes
Ralph Brown as Jaffe
 as Paco
Elsa Skolinstad as Inger
Patty Shepard as Pilar

Release
The film was distributed on DVD in America by Troma Entertainment.

See also
List of American films of 1967

External links

1967 films
1967 comedy films
Spanish independent films
Troma Entertainment films
American independent films
American comedy films
Films directed by Richard Rush
Films produced by Sidney W. Pink
1960s English-language films
1960s American films